Indian Beach may refer to:
Indian Beach (Marin County, California), a beach within Tomales Bay State Park in Marin County, California 
Indian Beach (Oregon), a beach within Ecola State Park in Oregon
Indian Beach, Delaware
Indian Beach, Florida, a historical neighborhood in Sarasota
Indian Beach, North Carolina
Old Home Beach (also known as Indian Beach), a beach in Trinidad, Humboldt County, California